The Pacific-Asia Junior Curling Championships (formerly known as the Pacific Junior Curling Championships) was an annual curling bonspiel held in the World Curling Federation's Pacific zone. The championships featured curlers under the age of 21 competing to qualify for a spot in the World Junior Curling Championships. Australia, China, Japan, New Zealand, and South Korea have participated in past championships. Replacing the European Junior Curling Challenge and the Pacific-Asia Junior Curling Championships in 2016, the World Junior B Curling Championships will now serve as the qualifier for the World Junior Curling Championships.

Summary

Men

Women

References

External links
World Curling Federation Results Archives

 
International curling competitions 
Curling
Curling
Youth curling
Youth sports competitions